The Eparchy of Stryi is an eparchy of the Ukrainian Greek Catholic Church. It is a suffragan see of the Archeparchy of Lviv. The first Eparch was Bishop Julian Gbur, who was appointed to this position by Pope John Paul II on 21 July 2000. He died on 24 March 2011. The incumbent eparch is Taras Senkiv. The Cathedral church of the diocese is the "Cathedral of Dormition of the Mother of God" in the city of Stryi.

On Wednesday, 20 January 2010, Pope Benedict XVI gave his assent to the declaration of impediment of the eparchial see of Stryi of the Ukrainians, Ukraine, canonically issued by the Synod of Bishops of the Greek-Catholic Ukrainian Church, because of the state of health of Julian Gbur, S.V.D., in accordance with Canon 233, Paragraph 1 of the Code of Canon Law for the Eastern Churches. He accepted the proposal of the Synod of Bishops of the Greek-Catholic Ukrainian Church to appoint Auxiliary Bishop Senkiv as Apostolic Administrator "ad nutum Sanctae Sedis" of the Eparchy of Stryi.

History
July 21, 2000: Established as Eparchy of Stryi from the Ukrainian Catholic Archeparchy of Lviv.

Eparchial and auxiliary bishops
The following is a list of the bishops of Stryi and their terms of service:
(21 Jul 2000 – 24 Mar 2011) Julian Gbur, S.V.D.
 (22 May 2008 – 20 Jan 2010) Taras Senkiv O.M., titular bishop of Siccenna, auxiliary 
 (20 Jan 2010 – 02 Apr 2014) Taras Senkiv O.M., titular bishop of Siccenna, Apostolic Administrator 
(since 02 Apr 2014 – ) Taras Senkiv O.M.
 (since 02 Apr 2014 – ) Bohdan Manyshyn, titular bishop of Lesvi, auxiliary

External links
GCatholic.org information on the eparchy

Stryi